Ferris Maynard Webster (April 29, 1912 – February 4, 1989) was an American film editor with approximately seventy-two film credits. He was nominated for Academy Awards for Best Film Editing for his work on Blackboard Jungle (1955), The Manchurian Candidate (1962), and The Great Escape (1963).

Webster was raised in the state of Washington, and was a student at the University of Southern California, where he was an outstanding track and field athlete. He was trained as an editor at the MGM Studios, and received his first feature-film credit in 1943 for Harrigan's Kid. At MGM, Webster edited six films with director Vincente Minnelli: Undercurrent (1946), Madame Bovary (1949), Father of the Bride (1950), Father's Little Dividend (1951), The Long, Long Trailer (1954), and Tea and Sympathy (1956). Film critic Bruce Eder has written of Madame Bovay that, "the cutting of the film in the gala ball sequence, in particular, was a marvel of the editor's art in the service of old Hollywood's restrained, elegant storytelling." In the mid-1950s, he edited three films with director Richard Brooks: Blackboard Jungle (1955), Something of Value (1957), and Cat on a Hot Tin Roof (1958); Webster received his first nomination for the Academy Award for Blackboard Jungle. His last film at MGM was Key Witness (1960).
 
Bruce Eder has written, "If ever a film editor deserved public recognition in the 1960s, it was Ferris Webster." Webster edited the three films of director John Frankenheimer's "paranoia trilogy": The Manchurian Candidate (1962), Seven Days in May (1964), and Seconds (1966). Eder writes that The Manchurian Candidate was "the editor's magnum opus. The shooting, cutting, and intercutting of one extended brainwashing sequence, seen from multiple points-of-view, is still striking decades later, and the movie earned Webster his second Academy Award nomination." Frankenheimer cast Webster in his only appearance as a film actor, as Air Force Gen. Bernard "Barney" Rutkowski in Seven Days in May.

Webster was nominated for an Academy Award for the editing of The Great Escape (1963), which was directed by John Sturges. Webster and Sturges' notable collaboration included fifteen films between 1950 and 1972, which is about half of Sturges' films in that period. It started with The Magnificent Yankee and Mystery Street (1950), and included The Law and Jake Wade (1958), The Magnificent Seven (1960), and Ice Station Zebra (1968). The final film of their collaboration was Joe Kidd (1972), which was near the end of Sturges' career.

Joe Kidd starred Clint Eastwood. In the last phase of his career, Webster edited and co-edited eight films that were directed by Eastwood, starting with High Plains Drifter (1973), which was Eastwood's second film as a director. Webster edited Breezy (1973), The Eiger Sanction (1975), The Outlaw Josey Wales (1976), The Gauntlet (1977), Bronco Billy (1980), Firefox and Honkytonk Man (both 1982). These latter two films with Eastwood concluded Webster's career as an editor, apparently after a falling-out between the two men.

Additional credits include The Picture of Dorian Gray (1945), Lili (1953), Forbidden Planet (1956), Les Girls (1957),  Divorce American Style (1967).

See also
List of film director and editor collaborations

References

American film editors
1912 births
1989 deaths